Korawad Chearavanont is a Thai entrepreneur, founder and CEO of Amity, formerly known as Eko, an enterprise communications app headquartered in Bangkok, Thailand.

Biography 
Chearavanont is the son of Suphachai Chearavanont, CEO of Charoen Pokphand Group, Thailand's largest private company where his grandfather Dhanin Chearavanont currently serves as senior chairman. He was educated at the Lawrenceville School and Columbia University for two years, where he was a history major, before leaving in 2015 to pursue a career in entrepreneurship.

Amity 
In 2012, Chearavanont founded Amity (previously known as Eko Communications) as a mobile chat app, taking a year off from boarding school to do so. After living in Princeton, NJ during a gap year and wanting to focus on Amity, Chearavanont made a deal with his family that he could quit college if he raised at least $5 million for his company, which he was able to do after initially raising a seed round from Tigerlabs Ventures which was quickly followed by a Series A funding through investors such as 500 Startups, Gobi Ventures, and Itochu. The Series B funding round led by Sinar Mas Digital Ventures raised $20 million, with investors such as Air Asia’s digital investment fund and EV Growth, giving a total amount of $28.7 million by 2019.

Chearavanont stated that the enterprise collaboration market “is really open right now” when discussing the many competitors like Slack, Microsoft, and Facebook.

Notable clients of Amity include companies such as Bangkok Bank, Thanachart Bank, BEC-TERO, True Corporation, and Telekom Malaysia. There are currently approximately five million active users across Asia, Europe, and North America.

In June 2020, Amity acquired local AI chatbot firm, ConvoLab, and formed a new parent firm, changing its name from Eko to Amity, as part of its expansion plans.

Accolades 
In 2016, Chearavanont was listed on "Forbes 30 Under 30 Asia" under the Enterprise Tech category.

References 

Korawad Chearavanont
Korawad Chearavanont
Lawrenceville School alumni
Columbia University alumni
Living people
Korawad Chearavanont
Year of birth missing (living people)